Interior Therapy with Jeff Lewis is an American reality television series that debuted March 14, 2012, on Bravo. It is a spin-off from Lewis' other Bravo show Flipping Out, and features both Jenni Pulos and Zoila Chavez.

Format
The show features Jeff Lewis and Jenni Pulos visiting the homes of clients and staying with them while a renovation takes place. As well as redecorating, Lewis attempts to rectify problems with his clients' relationships.

Production
During season two of Flipping Out, executives at Bravo began pitching spin-off show ideas to Lewis, as they initially saw the original show as having a lifespan of around three seasons. Most of the pitches were generic home improvement shows, and Lewis argued to keep a reality television element in the new project. The show wasn't designed to replace Flipping Out, but instead airs earlier in the year than Lewis' first Bravo show.

Interior Therapy was announced as one of eleven new shows on Bravo on March 30, 2011, with production by Authentic Entertainment. The show features both Jenni Pulos and Zoila Chavez in addition to Lewis from Flipping Out. The cast launched the show at the Bravo presentation at the Television Critics Association in January 2012. At the end of one of the episodes, the couple splits up. One of the producers wanted to film it in a way which would present it as a happy ending, but Lewis argued for a more authentic finish. He later described it as his favorite episode of the first season. The series airs on Arena in Australia.

The series was renewed for a second season on April 2, 2013, which premiered on July 9, 2013.

Episodes

Series overview

Season 1 (2012)

Season 2 (2013)

References

External links
 
 

2010s American reality television series
2012 American television series debuts
2013 American television series endings
English-language television shows
Bravo (American TV network) original programming
Television series by Authentic Entertainment
American television spin-offs
Interior design
Reality television spin-offs